The following lists events that happened during 2014 in Tonga.

Incumbents
Monarch: Tupou VI
Prime Minister: Sialeʻataongo Tuʻivakanō (until December 30), ʻAkilisi Pōhiva (starting December 30)

Events

January
 January 11 - Cyclone Ian strikes Tonga with damage to buildings reported.
 January 13 - Tonga restores contact with the Ha'apai islands after Cyclone Ian passed through during the weekend, killing one person and significantly damaging structures.

July
 July 3 - The government of Tonga reveals a proposal to trade the disputed Minerva Reefs to Fiji in exchange for the Lau Islands, in an effort to settle a decades-old territorial dispute between the two Pacific countries.

November
 November 27 - General election

References

 
2010s in Tonga
Years of the 21st century in Tonga
Tonga
Tonga